Isabella II (10 October 1830 – 9 April 1904), was Queen of Spain from 29 September 1833 until 30 September 1868. She is the only queen regnant in Spanish history.

Isabella was the elder daughter of King Ferdinand VII and Queen Maria Christina. Shortly before Isabella's birth, her father issued a Pragmatic Sanction to ensure the succession of his firstborn daughter, due to his lack of a son. She came to the throne a month before her third birthday, but her succession was disputed by her uncle Infante Carlos (founder of the Carlist movement), whose refusal to recognize a female sovereign led to the Carlist Wars. Under the regency of her mother, Spain transitioned from an absolute monarchy to a constitutional monarchy, adopting the Royal Statute of 1834 and Constitution of 1837. Her effective reign was a period marked by palace intrigues, back-stairs and antechamber influences, barracks conspiracies, and military pronunciamientos.  She was deposed in the Glorious Revolution of 1868, and formally abdicated in 1870. Her son, Alfonso XII, became king in 1874.

Birth and regencies 

Isabella was born in the Royal Palace of Madrid in 1830, the eldest daughter of King Ferdinand VII of Spain, and of his fourth wife and niece, Maria Christina of the Two Sicilies. She was entrusted to the royal governess María del Carmen Machín y Ortiz de Zárate. Queen Maria Christina became regent on 29 September 1833, when her three-year-old daughter Isabella was proclaimed sovereign following the death of Ferdinand VII.

Isabella succeeded to the throne because Ferdinand VII had induced the Cortes Generales to help him set aside the Salic law, introduced by the Bourbons in the early 18th century, and to reestablish the older succession law of Spain. The first pretender to the throne, Ferdinand's brother Infante Carlos, Count of Molina, fought for seven years during Isabella's minority to dispute her title (see First Carlist War). The supporters of Carlos and his descendants were known as Carlists, and the fight over the succession was the subject of a number of Carlist Wars in the 19th century.

Isabella's reign was maintained only through the support of the army. The Cortes and the Moderate Liberals and Progressives reestablished constitutional and parliamentary government, dissolved the religious orders and confiscated their property (including that of the Jesuits), and tried to restore order to Spain's finances. After the Carlist war, the regent, Maria Christina, resigned to make way for Baldomero Espartero, Prince of Vergara, the most successful and most popular Isabelline general. Espartero, a Progressive, remained regent for only two years.

Her minority saw tensions with the United States over the Amistad affair.

Baldomero Espartero was deposed in 1843 by a military and political pronunciamiento led by Generals Leopoldo O'Donnell and Ramón María Narváez. They formed a cabinet, presided over by Joaquín María López y López. This government induced the Cortes to declare Isabella of age at 13

Reign as an adult

Beginnings 

Isabella was declared of age and swore the 1837 Constitution on 10 November 1843, age thirteen. Despite the alleged parliamentary supremacy, in practice, the "double trust" led to Isabella having a role in the making and toppling of governments, undermining the progressives. The uneasy alliance between moderates and progressives that had toppled Espartero in July 1843 was already disintegrating by the time of the coming of age of the queen. Following a brief government led by progressive Salustiano de Olózaga, the moderates elected their candidate, Pedro José Pidal, to the presidency of the Cortes. After the subsequent decision to dissolve the hostile Cortes by Olózaga on 28 November, rumours about an alleged forcing of the queen to sign the royal decree spread. As a result, Olózaga was prosecuted, removed from political office, and forced to exile, with the Progressive Party already being beheaded, in what was the starting point of their growing disaffection from the Isabelline monarchy.

Moderate decade 

Dominated by the figure of Marshal Narváez, the Espadón ("Big Sword") of Loja, the so-called "Moderate decade" began in 1844. The constitutional reforms devised by Narváez moved away from the 1837 Constitution by rejecting national sovereignty and reinforcing the power of the monarch, to the point of a "co-sovereignty" between the Cortes and the Queen.

On 10 October 1846, the Moderate Party made their sixteen-year-old queen marry her double-first cousin Francisco de Asís, Duke of Cádiz (1822–1902), the same day that her younger sister, Infanta Luisa Fernanda, married Antoine d'Orléans, Duke of Montpensier. Disgusted by her marriage, Isabella reportedly commented later to one of her intimates: "what shall I tell you about a man whom I saw wearing more lace than I was wearing on our wedding night?".

The marriages suited France and Louis Philippe, King of the French, who as a result bitterly quarrelled with Britain. However, the marriages were not happy; persistent rumour had it that few if any of Isabella's children were fathered by her king-consort, rumoured to be a homosexual. The Carlist party asserted that the heir-apparent to the throne, who later became Alfonso XII, had been fathered by a captain of the guard, Enrique Puigmoltó y Mayans.

In 1847, a major scandal took place when Isabella, age seventeen, publicly showed her love for General Serrano and her willingness to divorce from her husband Francisco de Asís; though Narváez and Isabella's mother Maria Christina solved the problem posed to the monarchical institution—Serrano was shifted away from the capital to the post of Captain General of Granada in 1848—, the deterioration of the public image of the queen increased from then on. Following the near-revolution of 1848, Narváez was authorised to rule as dictator to repress insurrectionary attempts up until 1849.

In late 1851, Isabella II gave birth to her first daughter and heir presumptive, who was baptised on 21 December as María Isabel Francisca de Asís. Historians have attributed the Princess of Asturias' biological parenthood to José Ruiz de Arana, Gentilhombre de cámara.

On 2 February 1852, Isabella and the Royal Guard were caught by surprise while the Queen was leaving the Chapel of the Royal Palace intending to go with her parade to the church of Atocha: , an ordained priest and liberal activist approached the queen giving the impression of wanting to deliver her a message, and stabbed her.  The impact was reduced by the gold embroidery of her dress and by the baleen stays of her corset, and what was intended to be a stab wound to the chest only resulted in a minor incision at the right side of the belly. Merino, quickly seized by the halberdiers of the Royal Guard (with help from the dukes of Osuna and Tamames, the Marquis of Alcañices and the Count of Pinohermoso), was removed from sacerdocy and executed by garrote.

Under the government of the Count of San Luis (whose ascension to premiership had been solely founded on the support from the networks of the royal court), the system was in a critical state by June 1854. On 28 June 1854 a military pronunciamiento intending to force the queen to oust the government of the Count of San Luis, featuring Leopoldo O'Donnell (a "puritan" moderate), took place in Vicálvaro, the so-called Vicalvarada. The military coup (rather dominated by the moderates themselves) had a mixed result and O'Donnell (advised by Ángel Fernández de los Ríos and Antonio Cánovas del Castillo) proceeded then to seek for civilian support, promising new reforms not in the initial plans in order to appeal to progressives, by bringing a "liberal regeneration", as proclaimed in the Manifesto of Manzanares, drafted by Antonio Cánovas del Castillo and issued on 7 July 1854.

Days later, the situation was followed by a full-scale people's revolution, with revolutionary juntas organised on 17 July in Madrid, and barricades erected in the streets. With the prospect of a civil war on the horizon, Isabella was advised to appoint General Espartero (who enjoyed charisma and popular support) as prime minister. This renewed ascension of Espartero marked the beginning of the bienio progresista.

Progressive biennium 

Espartero entered the capital of Spain on 28 July, and proceeded to separate again Isabella from the influence of Maria Christina. In any case, though Isabella accepted advice from Maria Christina, she was not characterised for displaying a profound filial love towards her mother.

By virtue of a royal decree, Iloilo in the Philippines was opened to world trade on 29 September 1855, mainly to export sugar and other products to America, Australia and Europe.

A Liberal Constitution ("the Unborn One") was drafted in 1856, yet it was never enacted as the counter-revolutionary coup by O'Donnell seized power.

Later reign 

On 28 November 1857, Isabella II gave birth to a male heir, who was baptised on 7 December 1857 as Alfonso Francisco de Asís Fernando Pío Juan María Gregorio y Pelagio. Isabella II showed a special affection for the child, greater than that shown to her daughters.

The later part of her reign saw a war against Morocco (1859–1860), which ended in a treaty advantageous for Spain and cession of some Moroccan territory, the Spanish retake of Santo Domingo (1861–1865), and the fruitless Chincha Islands War (1864–1866) against Peru and Chile.

Revolution and coup 
In August 1866, exiled forces comprising both elements from the Democratic and the Progressive Party met secretly in Belgium and subscribed to the  under the initiative of Marshal Prim, seeking to topple Isabella. On 7 July 1868, Isabella banished her sister and brother-in-law from Spain, as they were linked to a conspiracy against the Crown in connivance with generals from the Liberal Union. 

Since late summer, Isabella II was enjoying her traditional holidays in the coast in Lekeitio, Biscay. The royal entourage moved to San Sebastián to hold a concerted meeting with Napoleon III and Eugenia de Montijo, scheduled for 18 September. But it did not take place, as the French royals did not arrive in time and it was subsequently aborted.

On that day, a pronunciamento took place in Cádiz. Led by Marshal Prim and the Admiral Topete (himself an unconditional follower of the Duke of Montpensier), it marked the beginning of the Glorious Revolution. The Democratic Party provided the insurrection with popular support, making it transcend the nature of a simple military statement into an actual revolution.

Factors for the revolution included the weariness of the moderates alienated by the Crown and the progressives barely having even the chance to rule. Both developed a vis-à-vis with the Isabelline monarchy. Other factors were the personal behaviour of the queen, the corruption, the abortion of the possibility of political reform and the economic crisis alienating the bourgeoisie. Historians looking at social roots for the revolution highlight that peasantry, small bourgeoisie, and the proletariat formed an alternative to bourgeoisie proper, articulated through the progressive and federal republican forces.

By September 1868 Isabella was a repudiated monarch, and, during the early stages of the revolution, instances of political iconoclasm carried out by the masses took place, leading to the destruction of many symbols and emblems of the Bourbon dynasty, a Damnatio memoriae.

The defeat of the Isabelline forces commanded by Manuel Pavía y Lacy by the revolutionary forces led by Marshal Serrano at the 28 September 1868 Battle of Alcolea led to the definitive demise of Isabella II's 35-year reign. In the light of the news, Isabella and her entourage left San Sebastián and went to exile taking a train to Biarritz (France) on 30 September. Primleader of the liberal progressiveswas received in a festive mood by the Madrilenian people at his arrival in the capital in early October. He pronounced his famous speech of the "three nevers" directed against the Bourbons. At the Puerta del Sol, he gave a highly symbolic hug to Serrano, the leader of the revolutionary forces triumphant in the bridge of Alcolea.

Life after ousting 
Following the crossing of the French–Spanish border by train on 30 September, the Queen and her husband spent 5 weeks in the Château de Pau organising their Parisian future. They went to the French capital and arrived on 8 November, settling in the Rue de Rivoli 172. Isabella was forced to renounce to her dynastic rights in Paris in favour of her son, Alfonso on 25 June 1870, officially "freely and spontaneously". Involving an economic settling, the formal separation between Isabella and Francisco had pended on the passing of the former queen's dynastic rights to her son.

Following the election to the Spanish throne of Amadeo of Savoy (second son of Victor Emmanuel II of Italy) in November 1870, Isabella reconciled in 1871 with her brother-in-law, the Duke of Montpensier, who assumed the political management of the family.

The First Spanish Republic that followed Amadeo's short reign was overthrown by a military coup started in Sagunto by General Arsenio Martínez Campos on 29 December 1874 that proclaimed the restoration of the monarchy and the Bourbon dynasty in the person of Isabella's son Alfonso XII, who landed in Barcelona on 9 January 1875.

After 1875 she lived in a relationship with Ramiro de la Puente y González Nandín, her secretary and chief of staff.

Cánovas del Castillo, the dominant figure of the new regime, became convinced that the figure of Isabella had become an issue for the Crown and wrote her a letter bluntly stating "Your Majesty is not a person, it is a reign, it is a historical time, and what the country needs is another reign, a different time", hellbent on avoiding the former queen stepping onto the Spanish capital before the proclamation of the new constitution in June 1876.

She returned to Spain in July 1876, stayed in Santander and El Escorial and was only allowed to visit Madrid for barely hours on 13 October. She moved to Seville, where she stood longer and left for France in 1877. Isabella's son would marry Mercedes of Orléans (first cousin of Alfonso and daughter of the Dukes of Montpensier) in 1878, only for the latter to die five months after the wedding.

Isabella mostly lived in Paris for the rest of her life, based at the Palacio Castilla. She paid some visits to Seville.

She wrote her testament in Paris in June 1901, making her will to be entombed in El Escorial. Less than a month after passing through a cold categorised as "flu" by the physicians, she died on 9 April 1904, at 8:45 AM. Her corpse was moved from the Palacio Castilla to the Gare d'Orsay, and arrived to El Escorial on 15 April. The funeral took place on the next day at San Francisco el Grande.

Children 

Isabella had twelve pregnancies, yet only five children reached adulthood:

 Infanta María Isabel (1851–1931): married her mother's and father's first cousin Prince Gaetan, Count of Girgenti.
 Alfonso XII of Spain (1857–1885) Future King of Spain.
 Infanta María del Pilar (1861–1879).
 Infanta María de la Paz (1862–1946); married her paternal first cousin Prince Louis Ferdinand of Bavaria.
 Infanta María Eulalia (1864–1958); married her maternal first cousin Infante Antonio d'Orléans, Duke of Galliera.

There has been considerable speculation that some or all of Isabella's children were not fathered by Francisco de Asís; this has been bolstered by rumours that Francisco de Asís was either homosexual or impotent. Francisco de Asís recognised all of them: he played the offended, proceeding to blackmail the queen to receive money in exchange for keeping his mouth shut. The extortion by her husband would continue and intensify during Isabella's exile.

Sobriquets
She came to be known by the sobriquets of the Traditional Queen (Spanish: la Reina Castiza), and the Queen of Sad Mischance (Spanish: la de los Tristes Destinos).

Honours
 : Dame of the Order of Queen Maria Luisa, 10 October 1830
 : Knight Grand Cordon with Collar of the Royal Hungarian Order of Saint Stephen
 : Dame of the Order of the Starry Cross, 1st Class
 : Knight Grand Cordon of the Imperial and Royal Order of Christ
 :: Knight Grand Cordon with Collar of the Imperial and Royal Order of the Southern Cross, 1848
 France
  Bourbon-French Royal Family: Knight Grand Cross of the Royal Order of the Holy Spirit
  Bourbon-French Royal Family: Knight Grand Cross with Collar of the Royal Order of Saint Michael
  French Imperial Family: Knight Grand Cordon with Collar of the Imperial Order of the Legion of Honour
  Bavaria: Knight Grand Cross with Chain of the Order of Saint Hubert
  Bavaria: Dame Grand Cross of the Order of Theresa
  Bavaria: Dame Grand Cross of the Order of Saint Elizabeth
 : Knight Grand Cross of the Order of the White Falcon, 1 November 1861
  Saxony: Knight Grand Cross of the Order of the Rue Crown
  Saxony: Dame Grand Cross of the Order of Sidonia
  Saxony: Dame of the Order of Maria-Anna, Special Class
  Greece: Knight Grand Cross of the Order of the Redeemer
 Italy
  Italian Royal Family: Knight Grand Collar of the Supreme Order of the Most Holy Annunciation
  Italian Royal Family: Knight Grand Cordon of the Order of Saints Maurice and Lazarus
  Italian Royal Family: Knight Grand Cordon of the Order of the Crown of Italy
  Holy See: Knight Grand Cross with Collar of the Supreme Order of Christ
  Two Sicilian Royal Family: Knight Grand Cross with Collar of the Order of Saint Januarius
  Two Sicilian Royal Family: Bailiff Knight Grand Cross with Collar of the Two Sicilian Sacred Military Constantinian Order of Saint George
 Mexico
  Mexican Republic: Knight Grand Cross with Collar of the National Order of Guadalupe, 1854
  Mexican Imperial Family: Dame Grand Cross of the Imperial Order of Saint Charles, 10 April 1865
 : Knight Grand Cross of the Order of Saint-Charles, 17 September 1865
  Portugal: Knight Grand Cross of the Order of the Immaculate Conception of Vila Viçosa, 23 June 1834
  Portugal: Knight Grand Cross with Collar of the Order of the Tower and Sword
  Portugal: Dame Grand Cross of the Order of Saint Isabel

Honorific eponyms
 :
Cavite: Bridge of Isabel II
Isabela (province)
Manila: El Banco Español Filipino de Isabel II former name of the current Bank of the Philippine Islands.
 :
Isabel II: barrio-pueblo (referred to as Isabel Segunda in Spanish) is a barrio and the administrative center (seat) in the downtown area in the island-municipality of Vieques, Puerto Rico.

Ancestry

Film portrayal
In the 1997 film Amistad, she was played by Anna Paquin, and is depicted as a spoiled 11-year-old girl.

See also
Carl Schurz, who was U.S. ambassador to Spain for a brief time at the beginning of Lincoln's presidency, in his Reminiscences (New York, McClure's Publ. Co., 1907, Volume II, Chapter VI) describes Isabel II and her court.
 Isabela province in the Philippines.
 Mid-19th-century Spain
 Spain under the Restoration
 Plaza de Isabel II (Santa Cruz de Tenerife)

References
Informational notes

Citations

Bibliography
 
 
 
 
 
 

 

Further reading
 Barton, Simon. A History of Spain (2009) excerpt and text search
 Carr, Raymond, ed. Spain: A History (2001) excerpt and text search
 Esdaile, Charles J. Spain in the Liberal Age: From Constitution to Civil War, 1808–1939 (2000) excerpt and text search
 Gribble, Francis Henry. The tragedy of Isabella, II (1913) online.

External links
 

|-

|-

|-

1830 births
1904 deaths
House of Bourbon (Spain)
Queens regnant in Europe
Modern child monarchs
Monarchs who abdicated
Spanish infantas
Princesses of Asturias
Princes of Viana
Spanish duchesses
Dukes of Montblanc
Spanish countesses
Lords of Spain
19th-century Spanish military personnel
Spanish generals
Commanders in chief
Grand Masters of the Order of the Golden Fleece
Knights of the Golden Fleece of Spain
Grand Masters of the Order of Isabella the Catholic
Knights Grand Cross of the Order of Isabella the Catholic
Grand Masters of the Royal and Military Order of San Hermenegild
Grand Crosses of the Royal and Military Order of San Hermenegild
Grand Crosses of Military Merit
Grand Crosses of Naval Merit
Grand Masters of the Order of Calatrava
Knights of Calatrava
Grand Masters of the Order of Santiago
Knights of Santiago
Grand Masters of the Order of Alcántara
Knights of the Order of Alcántara
Grand Masters of the Order of Montesa
Knights of the Order of Montesa
Grand Crosses of the Order of Saint-Charles
Knights Grand Cross of the Order of the Immaculate Conception of Vila Viçosa
Dames of the Order of Saint Isabel
Grand Crosses of the Order of Saint Stephen of Hungary
19th-century Spanish monarchs
19th-century Spanish women
20th-century Spanish women
19th-century women rulers
Burials in the Pantheon of Kings at El Escorial
Navarrese titular monarchs